John Morgan Howard (abt 1832 – 10 April 1891) was a British judge and Conservative Party politician.

He was called to the bar in 1858, became a QC in 1874, and in 1875 was appointed Recorder of Guildford. He contested the Lambeth constituency as a candidate in 1868, 1874 and 1880, and was finally elected Member of Parliament for Dulwich in the 1885 general election.

He resigned from parliament in 1887 on being appointed Judge in the County Court circuit in Cornwall. He died in Torquay.

He married Ann Bowes (1827-), daughter of George and Susanna Bowes, on 24 Feb 1857 at St Philip's Church, Dalston, London and they had one daughter, Ellen Theresa Howard (b. 1858 Islington, London).

References

External links 
 

1837 births
1891 deaths
Conservative Party (UK) MPs for English constituencies
Politics of the London Borough of Southwark
UK MPs 1885–1886
UK MPs 1886–1892
County Court judges (England and Wales)